Zoe Lianne Derham (born 24 November 1980 in Bristol) is a female hammer thrower from England. Her personal best throw is 68.63 metres, achieved in July 2008 in Loughborough. This places her fourth on the British all-time list, behind Lorraine Shaw, who is also her coach.

International competitions

References

External links
 
 
 
 
 
 

1980 births
Living people
Sportspeople from Bristol
British female hammer throwers
English female hammer throwers
Olympic female hammer throwers
Olympic athletes of Great Britain
Athletes (track and field) at the 2008 Summer Olympics
Commonwealth Games bronze medallists for England
Commonwealth Games medallists in athletics
Athletes (track and field) at the 2002 Commonwealth Games
Athletes (track and field) at the 2006 Commonwealth Games
Athletes (track and field) at the 2010 Commonwealth Games
Competitors at the 2007 Summer Universiade
Competitors at the 2005 Summer Universiade
World Athletics Championships athletes for Great Britain
British Athletics Championships winners
Medallists at the 2010 Commonwealth Games